Old Leupp is a populated place situated in Coconino County, Arizona, United States.

References

Populated places in Coconino County, Arizona